Sarah Edmondson is a Canadian actress and podcaster. She is known for supporting roles on Hallmark, and as voice actress in Geronimo Stilton and as “Lina” in the Bratz movies.

Edmondson is a former member of NXIVM, a now defunct multi-level marketing company founded by Keith Raniere. In 2017, she left the group and confirmed longstanding criticism that NXIVM operated as a cult. The resulting New York Times exposé of NXIVM's abusive practices precipitated the downfall of the organisation and its leaders.

Career
Edmondson studied in the theatre program at Lord Byng Secondary School, Vancouver, British Columbia. She then graduated from Concordia University, Montreal, with a BFA in Theatre Performance. She has performed in a variety of YTV programs including Are You Afraid of the Dark, Student Bodies, Big Wolf on Campus and in series such as Stargate SG-1, Andromeda, Godiva's, Edgemont and Continuum. In 2007, Edmondson was nominated for the Leo Awards in the category of "Best Lead Performance by a Female in a Short Drama" for her role in the Sparklelite Motel.

Edmondson is also a playwright. She performed her first play, a solo show, entitled Dead Bird, at the 2005 Chutzpah Festival.

Edmondson starred in Lifetime Television's Killer Hair and Hostile Makeover, and A Gun to the Head in 2009, followed by J.J. Abrams's series Fringe in 2010.

Most recently, Edmondson has been seen in a series of TV series and movies for Hallmark Channel, including When Calls the Heart (2014-present), Love at First Bark starring Jana Kramer, Wedding' March 2: Resorting to Love, and At Home in Mitford, based on the novel of the same name starring Andie MacDowell and Cameron Mathison.

Voice work
She has created original voices for various Barbie, Bratz and Polly Pocket movies. She also voices a number of animated series, including the characters of Lori in Transformers: Cybertron, (2005), Atlanta in Class of the Titans, Thea Stilton in Geronimo Stilton, and Sydney Gardner in Max Steel. Edmondson voiced the character of Windy Whistles in the My Little Pony: Friendship Is Magic season seven episode "Parental Glideance".

Personal life
Edmondson was previously married to a director. In 2010, she married actor and former Ivy League Quarterback Anthony Ames. The couple has two children. Edmondson is Jewish.

NXIVM
Edmondson was involved in the Albany, New York-based organization NXIVM. After leaving it in early 2017, she publicly denounced the organization, stating that she was invited into "DOS", a substructure within NXIVM operated by Keith Raniere and Allison Mack, and was branded with Raniere's and Mack's initials at Mack's Albany home. Edmondson said she was recruited into DOS by her friend and NXIVM member Lauren Salzman. At the time, Edmondson and other DOS recruits were told the brand represented the combination of the elements.

In 2017, at the urging of Catherine Oxenberg, Edmondson contacted Frank Parlato, a former NXIVM publicist, to share details about her branding experience. Parlato blogged about it at the Frank Report, with an agreement that he would not disclose Edmondson's name, in order to stop the next branding session from happening.

Edmondson showed the brand in a New York Times exposé of NXIVM in 2017.

Edmondson filed a complaint with the New York State Department against physician Dr. Danielle Roberts, alleging that Roberts performed the branding. The agency replied that it lacked jurisdiction because the alleged actions did not occur in a doctor-patient relationship, and advised Edmondson to report the matter to the police. After the allegations from Edmondson and others, Roberts was suspended from practice in a Wisconsin Hospital System where she had practiced between 2012 and 2014. Raniere and Mack were subsequently arrested on charges related to DOS; a trial was scheduled for January 2019.

Edmondson was the subject of a 2018 CBC podcast: Uncover: Escaping NXIVM, which is an investigative podcast series about the group, its leader Keith Raniere and one woman's journey to get out.

Her memoir, Scarred: The True Story of How I Escaped NXIVM, the Cult That Bound My Life, was published by Chronicle Books in September 2019.

In an interview with Vancouver Film School released February 11, 2020, Edmondson revealed that she had recently undergone surgery to have her brand removed.

Edmondson appears in the documentary series The Vow directed by Jehane Noujaim and Karim Amer, which premiered on August 23, 2020, on HBO.

She launched her own podcast called A Little Bit Culty, co-hosted by her husband and fellow NXIVM whistleblower Anthony "Nippy" Ames.

Filmography

Film

Television

Video games

References

External links
 
 
 
 

Actresses from Vancouver
Canadian film actresses
Canadian television actresses
Canadian video game actresses
Canadian voice actresses
Living people
Canadian people of Jewish descent
Jewish Canadian actresses
20th-century Canadian actresses
21st-century Canadian actresses
NXIVM people